The First Falls, a plunge waterfall on the Fourth Creek, is located in the Adelaide Hills region in the Australian state of South Australia.

See also

 List of waterfalls of South Australia

References

Waterfalls of South Australia
Adelaide Hills
Plunge waterfalls